The Maritime Pro Stock Tour (Commonly known as the Parts For Trucks Pro Stock Tour due to a sponsorship deal with Parts for Trucks) is an annual racing tour located in the Maritime provinces of Canada.

History
The Maritime Pro Stock Tour was founded in 2001 to provide a short track racing in the Maritime provinces and is the successor to the MASCAR Tour. It is now known as the Parts for Trucks Pro Stock Tour and was previously known as the Carquest Pro Stock Tour from 2001-2010.

The tour is known as one of the best in Canada and is recognized as one of the healthiest touring series in North America. Each summer the Maritime Pro Stock Tour draws some of the largest crowd of any summer sport in the Maritimes.

On August 4, 2013, driver Mike Stevens was in involved in a four car accident in with two laps remaining in the Exit Realty 100 at Oyster Bed Speedway in Oyster Bed Bridge, P.E.I. Stevens' car flipped onto its roof, but Stevens appeared to be unhurt. As Stevens remained upside down he began to remove his safety equipment, and in his effort he inadvertently strangled himself. The race was stopped immediately and Stevens was transferred to a local hospital where he was pronounced dead.

Maritime Pro Stock Tour tracks

The tour currently races on five different paved oval short tracks throughout the Maritimes; Riverside International Speedway and Scotia Speedworld in Nova Scotia, Petty International Raceway and Speedway 660 in New Brunswick and Oyster Bed Speedway in Prince Edward Island.

Riverside International Speedway was designed after the famed Bristol Motor Speedway in Bristol, Tennessee, making it a favourite among fans and competitors.

IWK 250

Since 2008 the series has played host to the IWK 250 at Riverside International Speedway in support of the IWK Health Centre in Halifax, Nova Scotia, which has quickly become their biggest and most high-profile race. The IWK 250 has attracted some of NASCAR's biggest stars, including NASCAR Hall of Fame inductee Mark Martin, 2012 NASCAR Sprint Cup Series champion Brad Keselowski, two-time Camping World Truck Series champion Matt Crafton and 2015 Daytona 500 winner Joey Logano.

In 2008, the first year the event was held as part of the Maritime Pro Stock Tour, Regan Smith became the first and to date only NASCAR regular to claim victory in the event.

List of tour champions

Race results

 Season still in progress Rained out

Title sponsors
 CARQUEST Auto Parts (2001–2010) 
 Parts for Trucks (2011–present)

References

External links
Speedway 660 Website
Petty Int'l Raceway Website
Oyster Bed Speedway Website
Riverside Int'l Speedway Website
Scotia Speedworld Website
Tours Official Website

Stock car races
Stock car racing series
Auto racing series in Canada
Motorsport in Canada
Recurring sporting events established in 2001
2001 establishments in Canada